In IBM mainframe operating systems, such as OS/360, MVS, z/OS, a Data Control Block (DCB) is a description of a dataset in a program. A DCB is coded in Assembler programs using the DCB macro instruction (which expands into a large number of "define constant" instructions). High level language programmers use library routines containing DCBs.

A DCB is one of the many control blocks used in these operating systems. A control block is a data area with a predefined structure, very similar to a C struct, but typically only related to system's functions. A DCB may be compared to a FILE structure in C, but it is much more complex, offering many more options for various access methods.

The control block acted as the Application programming interface between Logical IOCS and the application program and usually was defined within (and resided within) the application program itself. The addresses of I/O subroutines would be resolved during a linkedit phase after compilation or else dynamically inserted at OPEN time.

The equivalent control block for IBM DOS/360, DOS/VSE and z/VSE operating systems is a "DTF" (Define the file)

Typical contents of a DCB
 symbolic file name (to match a JCL statement for opening the file)
 type of access (e.g. random, sequential, indexed)
 physical characteristics (blocksize, logical record length)
 number of I/O buffers to allocate for processing to permit overlap of I/O
 address of I/O operating system library subroutines (e.g. read/write)
 other variables as required by the subroutines according to type

Prototype DCBs
Many of the constants and variables contained within a DCB may be left blank (i.e., these default to zero).

The OPEN process results in a merge of the constants and variables specified in the DD JCL statement, and the dataset label for existing magnetic tape and direct-access datasets, into the DCB, replacing the zero values with actual, non-zero values.

A control block called the JFCB (Job File Control Block) initially holds the information extracted from the DD statement for the dataset.  The results of the merge are stored in the JFCB which may also be written into the DSCB during the CLOSE process, thereby making the dataset definition permanent.

An example is the BLKSIZE= variable, which may be (and usually is) specified in the DCB as zero. In the DD statement, the BLKSIZE is specified as a non-zero value and this, then, results in a program-specified LRECL (logical record length) and a JCL-specified BLKSIZE (physical block size), with the merge of the two becoming the permanent definition of the dataset.

See also 
 Data Set Control Block (DSCB), a part of VTOC

IBM mainframe operating systems